Donald Wayne Munro is a New Zealand former professional rugby league footballer who played in the 1970s.

Playing career
Munro played for the Porirua City club in the Wellington Rugby League competition.

Representative career
Between 1970 and 1976 Munro played thirty six times for Wellington.

Munro was first selected for the New Zealand national rugby league team in 1974, in the squad for three test matches against the Great Britain Lions. Munro did not play in that series but he was selected to tour Australia in 1975, scoring six tries in seven games; including four on debut, against Central Queensland, at Rockhampton. He played three test matches later in the year, World Championship matches against France, England and Wales. He was dropped for the northern hemisphere tour of the Championship and did not play for the Kiwis again.

References

Living people
New Zealand national rugby league team players
New Zealand rugby league players
Place of birth missing (living people)
Porirua Vikings players
Rugby league players from Porirua
Rugby league wingers
Wellington rugby league team players
Year of birth missing (living people)